The 1980 Louisiana Tech Bulldogs football team was an American football team that represented Louisiana Tech University as a member of the Southland Conference during the 1980 NCAA Division I-A football season. In their first year under head coach Billy Brewer, the team compiled a 5–6 record. Brewer was hired as head coach in December 1979 following the dismissal of Larry Beightol after going 1–9 through the first ten games of the 1979 season.

Schedule

References

Louisiana Tech
Louisiana Tech Bulldogs football seasons
Louisiana Tech Bulldogs football